, provisionally known as , is a resonant trans-Neptunian object in the Kuiper belt located in the outermost regions of the Solar System. It measures approximately 291 kilometers in diameter. It has more carbon than typical of KBOs, and the first to be confirmed as having this composition in this region of space. It is thought that it had originated closer to the Sun, maybe even the main asteroid belt.

Orbit 

Like Pluto,  is classified as a plutino. It stays in a 2:3 resonance with Neptune.  For every 2 orbits that a plutino makes, Neptune orbits 3 times.

 is currently 27.0 AU from the Sun, and came to perihelion (q=26.98 AU) in April 2018.  This means that this object is currently inside the orbit of the planet Neptune.  Like Pluto, this plutino spends part of its orbit closer to the Sun than Neptune is even though their orbits are controlled by Neptune. (Probable dwarf planet Huya and plutino  are also currently inside the orbit of Neptune.) Simulations by the Deep Ecliptic Survey (DES) show that over the next 10 million years  can acquire a perihelion distance (qmin) as small as 24.6 AU.

It comes within  of Uranus and stays more than 21 AU from Neptune over a 14,000 year period.  has been observed 158 times with an observation arc of 13 years and has an orbit quality of 2.

Physical characteristics 

 has a dark albedo of 0.04, giving it a diameter of about 291 km. Its reflectance spectrum bears striking resemblance to those of some hydrated C-type asteroids, indicating that this object possibly formed in the same environment as the C-type asteroids found today in the outer asteroid belt.

Unlike the majority of small objects in the Kuiper belt observed so far, the visible spectrum of  has two features, each respectively associated with ferric oxides and phyllosilicates. The presence of a phyllosilicate feature in the spectrum of a minor planet indicates that the rocky component of its composition has been altered by the presence of liquid water at some point since its formation. While this energy could have been delivered by a very large chance collision, the strong overall similarity between the modern C-type asteroids in the outer asteroid belt and  suggests that these objects formed in the same region of the early Sun's protoplanetary disk, much closer to the Sun and at higher temperatures.

The Grand tack hypothesis predicts that the primitive C-type asteroids were dispersed from their formation location by the migrations of Jupiter and Saturn and many were injected into the outer asteroid belt where we find them today. By the same mechanism (and others that result from planetary formation), simulations show that C-types can also be thrown outward to the trans-Neptunian region, where later they may become captured into the mean-motion resonances of Neptune.

See also
List of trans-Neptunian objects
List of exceptional asteroids

References

External links 
 
 

120216
120216
20040314